Senecio or Head of a Man Going Senile is a 1922 Cubist painting by Swiss artist Paul Klee. It is currently in the Kunstmuseum Basel.

Analysis
Klee's adaptation of the human head divides an elderly face into rectangles of orange, red, yellow, and white. The flat geometric squares within the circle resemble a mask or the patches of a harlequin, hence the title's reference to the artist-performer Senecio. The triangle and curved line above the left and right eyes respectively give the illusion of a raised eyebrow.

The painting's use of lines, ambiguous shapes, and space all demonstrate the principles of Klee's artistry in which simple graphical elements are "set in motion by energy from the artist's mind."

See also
List of works by Paul Klee

References

External links

Paintings by Paul Klee
1920s paintings
Portraits by Swiss artists
Cubist paintings
Paintings in the collection of the Kunstmuseum Basel